Privacy Lost: How Technology is Endangering Your Privacy is a non-fiction book by David H. Holtzman, a technologist and privacy expert. The book is an examination into the effect that technology is having and will have on human society. The book was released in September, 2006.

The book is written in a conversational style, and aimed at the general public. Holtzman's contention is that the majority of people are blissfully unaware of how much information is being gathered about them, nor do they understand the power this information has when looked at in aggregate. Because of this, the book can be said to be an examination into the conceptual history of privacy, the current state of societal interaction with privacy, and technology's impact thereon, and a cautionary message about the future dangers posed by the current track we are on.

Summary
Holtzman divides Privacy Lost into six sections:

 Privacy Invasions Hurt - Examines the damages caused by the loss of privacy, including descriptions of the “Seven Sins Against Privacy” and the collateral damage this loss causes society.
 Why Technology is Key - The history behind Americans’ concept of privacy, how and why technology affects privacy, and how new forms of technology create new types of crimes.
 Privacy in Context - Inspects the relationship between privacy and the law, identity and culture in a technological world.
 The Technology Eroding Privacy - Discusses the voyeurism of surveillance technology and the virtual “stalking” capabilities allowed by networks, tags and locators.
 The Watchers - Takes a close look at the two main culprits invading Americans’ privacy: corporate marketers and the U.S. Government.
What Can Be Done? - What the future holds in store for our privacy, including ways our privacy can be safeguarded and a call to action for all those who feel troubled by the path down which our privacy is being led, including how to “fight back”.

Sins against privacy
Holtzman starts by laying out what he describes as the "Seven Sins" against privacy and prescribes 'commandments' which correlate to each. The sins are as follows:

 The Sin of Intrusion - Commandment: Don't spy on me just because you can.
 The Sin of Latency - Commandment: Thou shall erase my data.
 The Sin of Deception - Commandment: Keep my information to thyself.
 The Sin of Profiling - Commandment: Don't judge me by your data. 
 The Sin of Identity Theft - Commandment: Protect my data as if it were thine own.
 The Sin of Outing - Commandment: I am who I say I am.
 The Sin of Lost Dignity - Commandment: Don't Humiliate me with my private information.

Terminology introduced

 Warhol - Internet celebrities, people raised to celebrity status in small subsections because of their activity online on sites like YouTube and Myspace—based on the phrase fifteen minutes of fame, coined by American avant-garde artist Andy Warhol. E.g., Kibo, lonelygirl15, Brooke Brodack, and Christine Dolce, a.k.a. "ForBiddeN." 
 Panopticon - The point in the future at which we are all observed without our knowledge – based on a prison designed by 18th century British philosopher Jeremy Bentham. 
 Puppetry - Unapproved use of another person’s virtual identity.
 Taggles – a “gaggle of tags” – A hypothetical situation in which real world tags (e.g., RFID tags) can track a person’s journey through the day while also connecting to databases which connect the tagged object (e.g., clothing) to the owner. 
 Golem Porn - Simulated pornography either entirely digitized or with real faces grafted on to bodies to which they do not belong.

Strategies for resisting privacy violations

Holtzman lays out five profiles which he describes as archetypes of how people cope with the coming omnipresence of surveillance and database technology.

 The Ignorer - Ignorers pretend there is no problem… Not an effective long term strategy.
 The Avoider - Avoiders duck situations in which they have to give out personal information. This strategy works less well after 9/11 and will become less effective with time.
 The Deceiver - The deceiver lies. It works for now, but as databases are becoming cross-linked, soon liars will be caught by technological double-checking and force to authenticate with real info.
 The Curmudgeon - Curmudgeons refuse to give out information. This includes avoiding the use of technologies which are easily spied upon. This strategy is increasingly ineffective with the pervasiveness of wireless internet, cordless phones, and electronic communication (e.g., Skype). The curmudgeon never puts their SSN on any form except for a mandatory government form.  
 The Vigilante - Vigilantes strike back. They put up websites talking about experiences with vendors, and track down scam artists on their own. In the future they will strike back against spammers with Denial-of-Service attacks, viruses, spear phishing, and other forms of digital retribution.

References

External links

 www.DavidHotlzman.com official site
 GlobalPOV official site

2006 non-fiction books
Current affairs books